John Otto Simus (January 27, 1943 – March 15, 2018) was an American ice hockey Forward and Vietnam veteran who was an All-American for Colorado College

Career
Simus joined the varsity squad at Colorado College in 1961 and suffered through one of the worst seasons in the history of college hockey. Simus scored 14 points for the Tigers and the team lost all 23 games they played during the campaign. CC's offense wasn't great but it was the defense that caused the most trouble; the Tigers allowed an average of almost 8 goals per game. The next season the team saw a vast improvement in play and produced a winning season (12–11) for the first time in five years. Head coach Tony Frasca was named as the National coach of the year for the quick turnaround but he resigned at the end of the season. As a senior Simus was relied on heavily by new bench boss Bob Johnson. Simus responded by leading the team in scoring and was named to the  All-WCHA First Team and was an All-American.

After graduating, Simus eventually joined the Army Rangers and served both in Vietnam and the Dominican Republic. After leaving the military, Simus worked for Electronic Data Systems for 30 years.

Career statistics

Regular season and playoffs

Awards and honors

References

External links

1943 births
2018 deaths
American ice hockey forwards
Ice hockey people from Minneapolis
Colorado College Tigers men's ice hockey players
AHCA Division I men's ice hockey All-Americans
United States Army Rangers
United States Army personnel of the Vietnam War
United States Army officers